Roller hockey was one of the sports featured in World Games I. The 1981 Games were the first World Games, an international quadrennial multi-sport event, and were held in Santa Clara, California in the United States. Roller hockey or its more recent variant, inline hockey (since 2005) has appeared in all editions of the World Games to date, except 1997.

Six teams contested each other in pool play. The games were played July 27–July 31, 1981 at Cal Skate Roller Rink in Milpitas, California. Teams from Argentina, Brazil, Chile, Italy,  Portugal, and the United States participated.  Pereira Christiano of the Portuguese team observed, "I thought World Games might be another Olympiad. But I know the Olympiad, and World Games doesn't compare."

Medalists

Sources:

Standing

Details

The six teams played one game each against all of the other teams during the five-day competition.

Monday, July, 27, 1981:

Argentina 5, Chile 2Portugal 3, Brazil 1United States 3, Italy 2

Tuesday, July 28, 1981:

 Portugal 3, Argentina 3,  tieUnited States 7, Chile 0Italy 6, Brazil 4

Wednesday, July 29, 1981:

Italy 4, Chile 3Argentina 6, Brazil 2United States 2, Portugal 2, tie

Thursday, July 30, 1981:

Italy 5, Argentina 4United States 3, Brazil 3, tiePortugal 3, Chile 0

Friday, July 31, 1981:

Brazil 4, Chile 3United States 2, Argentina 2, tiePortugal 5, Italy 2

Other known individual participants:  BRA – Casado, Mauricio Duque, Guedes, Hequena, Newshander; CHI – Bendek, Munoz, Salvatierra; ITA – Colamaria, Giuseppe Marzella, Villani

References

1981 World Games
Roller hockey competitions
1981 in roller sports